CD-44 170, also known as Gliese 27.1, Gliese 9018 and HIP 3143, is an M-type main-sequence star. Its surface temperature is  K. The star's concentration of heavy elements is similar to that of the Sun.

Planetary system
In 2014, a planet named Gliese 27.1 b with an orbital period of 16 days was announced. It was discovered using the radial velocity method. The planet's existence was doubted until 2020 because the putative orbital period is equal to half of the star's rotational period.

References

Phoenix (constellation)
M-type main-sequence stars
Hypothetical planetary systems
J00395880-4415117
003141
9018
CD-44 170